Tragocephala nobilis is a species of beetle in the family Cerambycidae. It was described by Johan Christian Fabricius in 1787, originally under the genus Lamia. It has a wide distribution in Africa. It feeds on Coffea arabica. It is preyed on by the parasitic wasp Aprostocetus lamiicidus, and the parasitic fly Billaea vanemdeni.

Varietas
 Tragocephala nobilis var. bifasciata Baguena Corella, 1952
 Tragocephala nobilis var. fasciata Kolbe, 1893
 Tragocephala nobilis var. chloris Chevrolat, 1858
 Tragocephala nobilis var. diamenta Gilmour, 1956
 Tragocephala nobilis var. fuscovelutina Fairmaire, 1893
 Tragocephala nobilis var. basosuturalis Gilmour, 1956
 Tragocephala nobilis var. galathea Chevrolat, 1855
 Tragocephala nobilis var. fontanai Baguena, 1942

References

nobilis
Beetles described in 1787